Gargar may refer to:

 Gargar, Armenia
 Gərgər, Azerbaijan
 Gargar-e Paini, Iran
 Gargar, Chaharmahal and Bakhtiari, Iran
 Gargar, Lorestan, Iran
 Gargar, Khuzestan, Iran
 Gargar-e Sofla, Khuzestan, Iran
 Gərgər, Ingush, Russia
 Yüksekova, Turkey

See also
Gargareans
Garga (disambiguation)
Gargar-e Sofla (disambiguation)
Gerger, Iran (disambiguation)
Gorgor (disambiguation)
Korkor (disambiguation)
Qarqar (Karkar) (disambiguation)